Mark Anderson is an American Republican Party politician currently serving as a member of the Connecticut House of Representatives from the 62nd district, which includes the towns of Barkhamsted, Granby, Hartland, and New Hartford since 2021. Anderson was first elected in 2020 after defeating Democrat Audrey Lampert. Anderson currently serves as a member of the Labor and Public Employees Committee, Veteran's Affairs Committee, and the Commerce Committee.

References

Living people
Democratic Party members of the Connecticut House of Representatives
People from Granby, Connecticut
Year of birth missing (living people)